The 2020–21 BYU Cougars women's basketball team represents Brigham Young University during the 2020–21 NCAA Division I women's basketball season. It is head coach Jeff Judkins's twentieth season at BYU. The Cougars, members of the West Coast Conference, play their home games at the Marriott Center.

Before the season

Departures

Newcomers

2020–21 media

BYU Sports Media

All Cougars home games are being shown on BYUtv or the BYUtv App. Conference road games are being shown on WCC Network. All remaining non-conference road games are also being streamed. Streaming partners for those games can be found on the schedule.

Roster

Schedule

|-
!colspan=8 style=| Non-conference regular season

|-
!colspan=8 style=| WCC regular season

|-
!colspan=8 style=| WCC Tournament

|-
!colspan=8 style=| NCAA tournament

Conference games at Portland and home vs. San Diego were postponed by COVID-19 protocols and were not able to be rescheduled before the WCC Tournament.
Non-conference games against Dixie State, Boise State, and Utah Valley were canceled due to the COVID-19 pandemic. Meanwhile UT Martin was replaced by Washington for the second South Point Shootout game. Finally Southern Utah was added to the schedule after both teams had their games against Utah Valley canceled by the pandemic protocols. The addition of Southern Utah allowed BYU to play against former Cougar Liz Graves in her final season. Graves had spent her first two seasons at BYU.

Game Summaries

LSU
Broadcasters: Garrett Walvoord
Series History: First Meeting
Starting Lineups:
BYU: Shaylee Gonzales, Maria Albiero, Lauren Gustin, Paisley Harding, Sara Hamson
LSU: Awa Trasi, Jailin Cherry, Khayla Pointer, Karli Seay, Faustine Aifuwa

Washington
Broadcasters: Gary Hill Jr.
Series History: Washington leads series 7–5
Starting Lineups:
Washington: Quay Miller, Tameiya Sadler, Jayda Noble, Haley Van Dyke, Khayla Rooks
BYU: Shaylee Gonzales, Maria Albiero, Lauren Gustin, Paisley Harding, Sara Hamson

Utah State
Broadcasters: Jaden Johnson
Series History: BYU leads series 37–4
Starting Lineups:
BYU: Shaylee Gonzales, Maria Albiero, Lauren Gustin, Paisley Harding, Sara Hamson
Utah State: Faith Brantley, Kama Kamakawiwo'ole, Meagan Mendazona, Jessica Chatman, Emmie Harris

Montana State
Broadcasters: Spencer Linton, Kristen Kozlowski & Kiki Solano 
Series History: BYU leads series 13–4 
Starting Lineups:
Montana State: Darian White, Tori Martell, Kola Bad Bear, Katelynn Limardo, Madison Jackson
BYU: Shaylee Gonzales, Maria Albiero, Lauren Gustin, Paisley Harding, Sara Hamson

Southern Utah
Broadcasters: Kylee Young & Joshua Price
Series History: BYU leads series 18–4
Starting Lineups:
BYU: Shaylee Gonzales, Maria Albiero, Lauren Gustin, Paisley Harding, Sara Hamson
Southern Utah: Margarita Satini, Liz Graves, Cherita Daugherty, Madelyn Eaton, Darri Frandsen

San Francisco
Broadcasters: Spencer Linton & Kristen Kozlowski
Series History: BYU leads series 20–6 
Starting Lineups:
San Francisco: Amalie Langer, Lucie Hoskova, Joanna Krimili, Lucija Kostic, Abby Rathbun
BYU: Shaylee Gonzales, Maria Albiero, Lauren Gustin, Paisley Harding, Sara Hamson

Santa Clara
Broadcasters: Spencer Linton, Kristen Kozlowski & Jason Shepherd
Series History: BYU leads series 19–2
Starting Lineups:
Santa Clara: Lexie Pritchard, Ashlee Maldonado, Ashlyn Herlihy, Lindsey VanAllen, Danja Stafford
BYU: Shaylee Gonzales, Maria Albiero, Lauren Gustin, Paisley Harding, Sara Hamson

San Diego
Broadcasters: Seth Smith 
Series History: BYU leads series 13–7 
Starting Lineups:
BYU: Shaylee Gonzales, Maria Albiero, Lauren Gustin, Paisley Harding, Sara Hamson
San Diego: Steph Gorman, Myah Pace, Jordyn Edwards, Kendall Bird, Sydney Hunter

Loyola Marymount
Broadcasters: Brendan Craig & Gary Craig
Series History: BYU leads series 17–2
Starting Lineups:
BYU: Shaylee Gonzales, Maria Albiero, Lauren Gustin, Paisley Harding, Sara Hamson
Loyola Marymount: Ciera Ellington, Chelsey Gipson, Ariel Johnson, Khari Clark, Meghan Mandel

Saint Mary's
Broadcasters: Spencer Linton, Kristen Kozlowski, & Kiki Solano
Series History: BYU leads series 11–10 
Starting Lineups:
Saint Mary's: Taycee Wedin, Madeline Holland, Tayla Dalton, Jade Kirisome, Brianna Simonich
BYU: Shaylee Gonzales, Maria Albiero, Lauren Gustin, Paisley Harding, Sara Hamson

Pacific
Broadcasters: Spencer Linton, Kristen Kozlowski & Jason Shepherd
Series History: BYU leads series 15–4
Starting Lineups:
Pacific: Brooklyn McDavid, Erica Adams, Valerie Higgins, Lianna Tillman, Sam Ashby
BYU: Shaylee Gonzales, Maria Albiero, Lauren Gustin, Paisley Harding, Sara Hamson

Gonzaga
Broadcasters: Rob Jesselson, Stephanie Hawk-Freeman, & Joe McHale 
Series History: Gonzaga leads series 17–12 
Starting Lineups:
BYU: Shaylee Gonzales, Maria Albiero, Lauren Gustin, Paisley Harding, Sara Hamson
Gonzaga: Jenn Wirth, LeeAnne Wirth, Kayleigh Truong, Cierra Walker, Jill Townsend

Pepperdine
Broadcasters: Spencer Linton, Kristen Kozlowski & Kiki Solano
Series History: BYU leads series 22–3
Starting Lineups:
Pepperdine: Malia Bambrick, Jayda Ruffus-Milner, Cheyenne Givens, Monique Andriuolo, Jayla Ruffus-Milner
BYU: Shaylee Gonzales, Maria Albiero, Lauren Gustin, Paisley Harding, Sara Hamson

Loyola Marymount
Broadcasters: Dave McCann, Kristen Kozlowski, & Jason Shepherd
Series History: BYU leads series 18–2
Starting Lineups:
Loyola Marymount: Chelsey Gipson, Nicole Rodriguez, Ariel Johnson, Khari Clark, Meghan Mandel
BYU: Shaylee Gonzales, Maria Albiero, Lauren Gustin, Paisley Harding, Sara Hamson

Pepperdine
Broadcasters: Darren Preston
Series History: BYU leads series 23–3
Starting Lineups:
BYU: Shaylee Gonzales, Maria Albiero, Lauren Gustin, Paisley Harding, Sara Hamson
Pepperdine: Malia Bambrick, Jayda Ruffus-Milner, Cheyenne Givens, Monique Andriuolo, Jayla Ruffus-Milner

Pacific
Broadcasters: Don Gubbins
Series History: BYU leads series 16–4
Starting Lineups:
BYU: Shaylee Gonzales, Maria Albiero, Lauren Gustin, Paisley Harding, Sara Hamson
Pacific: Brooklyn McDavid, Erica Adams, Valerie Higgins, Lianna Tillman, Sam Ashby

Saint Mary's
Broadcasters: Ben Ross
Series History: BYU leads series 12–10 
Starting Lineups:
BYU: Shaylee Gonzales, Maria Albiero, Lauren Gustin, Paisley Harding, Sara Hamson
Saint Mary's: Taycee Wedin, Madeline Holland, Tayla Dalton, Jade Kirisome, Brianna Simonich

Gonzaga
Broadcasters: Spencer Linton, Kristen Kozlowski, & Kiki Solano
Series History: Gonzaga leads series 18–12 
Starting Lineups:
Gonzaga: Jenn Wirth, LeeAnne Wirth, Kayleigh Truong, Cierra Walker, Jill Townsend
BYU: Shaylee Gonzales, Maria Albiero, Lauren Gustin, Paisley Harding, Sara Hamson

Portland
Broadcasters: Spencer Linton, Kristen Kozlowski, & Kiki Solano
Series History: BYU leads series 25–5 
Starting Lineups:
Portland: Keeley Frawley, Emme Shearer, Haylee Andrews, Alex Fowler, Maddie Muhlheim
BYU: Shaylee Gonzales, Maria Albiero, Lauren Gustin, Paisley Harding, Sara Hamson

Santa Clara
Broadcasters: Joe Ritzo
Series History: BYU leads series 20–2
Starting Lineups:
BYU: Shaylee Gonzales, Maria Albiero, Lauren Gustin, Paisley Harding, Sara Hamson
Santa Clara: Lexie Pritchard, Merle Wiehl, Ashlee Maldonado, Ashlyn Herlihy, Lindsey VanAllen

San Francisco
Broadcasters: George Devine
Series History: BYU leads series 21–6 
Starting Lineups:
BYU: Shaylee Gonzales, Maria Albiero, Lauren Gustin, Paisley Harding, Sara Hamson
San Francisco: Amalie Langer, Lucie Hoskova, Ioanna Krimili, Lucija Kostic, Abby Rathbun

WCC Semifinal: San Francisco
Broadcasters: Spencer Linton & Kristen Kozlowski
Series History: BYU leads series 21–7 
Starting Lineups:
San Francisco: Amalie Langer, Lucie Hoskova, Ioanna Krimili, Lucija Kostic, Abby Rathbun
BYU: Shaylee Gonzales, Maria Albiero, Lauren Gustin, Paisley Harding, Sara Hamson

WCC Championship: Gonzaga
Broadcasters: Paul Sunderland & Andraya Carter (ESPNU)  Greg Wrubell & Kristen Kozlowski (BYU Radio 107.9 FM) 
Series History: Gonzaga leads series 18–13 
Starting Lineups:
BYU: Shaylee Gonzales, Maria Albiero, Lauren Gustin, Paisley Harding, Sara Hamson
Gonzaga: Jenn Wirth, LeeAnne Wirth, Kayleigh Truong, Cierra Walker, Jill Townsend

NCAA 1st Round: Rutgers
Broadcasters: Kevin Fitzgerald & Christy Thomaskutty (ESPNU)  Jason Shepherd & Kristen Kozlowski (BYU Radio 107.9 FM)
Series History: First Meeting 
Starting Lineups:
BYU: Shaylee Gonzales, Maria Albiero, Lauren Gustin, Paisley Harding, Sara Hamson
Rutgers: Diamond Johnson, Arella Guirantes, Mael Gilles, Tyia Singleton, Kate Martin

NCAA 2nd Round: Arizona
Broadcasters: Tiffany Greene & Steffi Sorensen  Jason Shepherd & Kristen Kozlowski (BYU Radio 107.9 FM)
Series History: BYU leads 8–5 
Starting Lineups:
BYU: Shaylee Gonzales, Maria Albiero, Lauren Gustin, Paisley Harding, Sara Hamson
Arizona:

Conference Honors
Shaylee Gonzales, Sara Hamson, and Paisley Johnson Harding were selected to the 2020–21 All-WCC Preseason Women's Basketball Team.
On November 30 Shaylee Gonzales was awarded the WCC Player of the Week.
On January 18 Lauren Gustin was awarded the WCC Player of the Week.

Rankings
2020–21 NCAA Division I women's basketball rankings

References

BYU Cougars women's basketball seasons
BYU
BYU Cougars
BYU Cougars
BYU